The Misty Montes are a range of mountains on Titan, the largest moon of the planet Saturn. The range is located in the northern hemisphere of Titan, between 56-7° north and 61-3° west.

The Misty Montes are named after the Misty Mountains, a range of mountains in J. R. R. Tolkien's fictional world of Middle Earth which appears most prominently in The Hobbit. The name follows a convention that Titanean mountains are named after mountains in Tolkien's work. It was formally announced on November 13, 2012.

References

Mountain ranges
Surface features of Titan (moon)
Extraterrestrial surface features named for Middle-earth